Broad Green railway station is a railway station serving the Broadgreen district of Liverpool, England,  east of Liverpool Lime Street. Established in 1830, it is the world's oldest actively operating railway station. Electrically powered trains have been operating through the station since March 2015, using Class 319 EMUs.

History
The oldest passenger station in the world was Crown Street railway station on the Liverpool and Manchester passenger railway opening on 17 September 1830. The trains set out on the first day at the Liverpool end. The second station on the line was the original Edge Hill railway station, the third was Broad Green station. In 1836 Crown Street station was demolished and Edge Hill decommissioned. A new Edge Hill station opened to the north of the original station in the grounds of the Edge Hill junction. This leaves Broad Green station as the oldest used railway station in the world. The current station buildings are not original, dating from 1972.

About  to the east of the station the abandoned North Liverpool Extension Line passes under the lines, which is currently part of the Trans Pennine Trail.

Facilities
The ticket office is located on the Liverpool-bound platform (platform 1) and like most Merseytravel-sponsored stations is staffed throughout the hours of service, seven days per week.  A waiting shelter is provided on platform 2 and there are digital display screens and customer help points provided on both sides.  The platforms are linked by a subway with steps, but level access is available to both sides via nearby streets.

Merseytravel announced in April 2019 that they had been successful in a bid for funding lifts being installed at the station under the Department for Transport's ‘Access for All’ programme. The lifts are expected to be installed at some point over the following five years.

The station is located very close to junction 4 of the M62 motorway however it is not a 'parkway' or an 'interchange' station. It has recently introduced a 'Park and Ride' scheme, with a large car park situated on the south side of the station. Broadgreen Hospital is a little under half a mile away.

Services

The normal eastbound off-peak service is of two trains per hour to Wigan North Western, and one train per hour to  via . During peak times, additional services to  also operate. 

On Sundays, there is an hourly service from Lime Street to Blackpool North via Wigan North Western.

Gallery

References

External links

Railway stations in Liverpool
DfT Category E stations
Former London and North Western Railway stations
Railway stations in Great Britain opened in 1830
Northern franchise railway stations
1830 establishments in England